En nombre del amor (English: In the Name of Love) is a Mexican telenovela produced by Carlos Moreno Laguillo for Televisa. It is a remake of Cadenas de amargura, by  María del Carmen Peña y José Cuauhtémoc Blanco, and produced in 1991.

Victoria Ruffo and Arturo Peniche star as the main protagonists, with Allisson Lozz and Sebastián Zurita as co-protagonists, while Leticia Calderón and Altaír Jarabo are the main antagonists. It also features Laura Flores, César Évora, Natalia Esperón, Alfredo Adame, Víctor Cámara and Magda Guzmán and special guest: Luis Hacha.

Plot
"En Nombre Del Amor" is the story of Macarena (Victoria Ruffo) and Carlota (Leticia Calderón), who are sisters and who went through a lot of pain, loneliness and shame, because they fell in love with the same man - Cristobal Gamboa (Arturo Peniche). This unhappy love triangle had an enormous influence on the mature stages of their lives. An interesting fact is that they are both still virgins, which isn't typical for their age. Carlota deceived both Macarena and Cristobal by having both of them believe the other had died. As a result, Cristobal fell in love with Natalia (a friend of Paloma's adoptive mother Sagrario).  He soon became haunted by his past, and resulted in him leaving Natalia standing at the altar on their wedding day.

At the same time we follow two other characters - Paloma (Allisson Lozz) and Romina (Altair Jarabo), who are best friends and know each other since they were children. Their relationship goes through many of the typical difficulties of youth and at some point they even become rivals because of their first love.

After losing her parents Javier (Eduardo Capetillo) and Sagrario (Bibi Gaytán) in a tragic car crash (during which they were returning from Cristobal and Natalia's short-lived wedding), Paloma is forced to move in with her two maiden aunts - Macarena and Carlota. Macarena is loving and kind, and she establishes a very close and warm relationship with her niece. Carlota, on the other hand, has an authoritarian temper and cruel intentions. It seems that she enjoys making Paloma's life miserable. But both aunts keep a family secret that could change Paloma's life forever.

When Paloma meets Inaki (Luis Hacha), she believes he is her first and only true love. Inaki is the son of divorced parents Alonso and Carmen. He is also the stepson of Natalia (the same Natalia that Cristobal refused to marry years ago), who had married Alonso and had a daughter with him that Natalia named Sagrario in memory of her friend. Soon, Paloma makes plans to marry him, but her aunt Carlota does whatever she can to break up their relationship. Paloma and Inaki at first plan to run away to Spain, but after Paloma has a nightmare about Macarena dying, she convinces Inaki to take her back to Real del Monte, but the two suffer a car accident, and Paloma's life is saved when Emiliano (Sebastian Zurita), a friend of Inaki's donates his blood to Paloma. Macarena thanks Emiliano for doing that and says he's like a guardian angel. Although Paloma believes that Carlota does not want her to marry Inaki, Carlota tells Paloma that she has her permission to marry him.

However, after Paloma and Inaki are released from the hospital, they have a party to celebrate their upcoming wedding. Carlota bought belladonna and poisons Inaki with the belladonna in his cup during the champagne party.  He becomes increasingly sick the next day when the wedding is supposed to take place. Once Emiliano informs Paloma about this, she is hysterical and Emiliano takes Paloma to Inaki's house, where Inaki dies with Paloma at his side. After this tragedy Paloma thinks she will never find love again. But then Emiliano appears in her life to change it for the better. Emiliano and Paloma fall in love, but the problem is he is Romina's boyfriend and also the object of Carlota's hatred, which makes their love impossible.

Later on, Arcadia (the maid of Inaki's family) calls Carlota and tells her she suspects her of killing Inaki, and blackmails her into bringing her money. One night, Carlota and Arcadia meet on a road where Carlota gives Arcadia the money, and then she kills Arcadia by hitting her with her car, throwing her now-lifeless body off the road afterwards. Some time later, Cristobal (now a priest) comes to Real del Monte and after having a conversation with Paloma one day, he discovers Macarena is alive, and meets her in the hospital. After a tearful reunion, this causes relations to sour between Carlota and Macarena where during one argument it is revealed that Paloma is in fact Macarena's real-daughter. Paloma learns about this revelation and gets mad at Macarena and initially leaves home, but later returns and accepts the truth.

Macarena and Cristobal continue to spend time together, until eventually one night Cristobal proposes to Macarena. Macarena accepts his proposal and Cristobal then plans to leave the priesthood. However, during a phone conversation between the two one day, Carlota learns of their plans and ends up getting very angry with her. An enraged Carlota pushes Macarena through a window-like glass on the second floor and Macarena falls to her death, but not right away. At the hospital, Doctors attempt to save Macarena's life, but she eventually succumbs to her injuries from Carlota pushing her and dies with Paloma and Cristobal at her side. Paloma later wants to know who her real father is, but Carlota hires an actor to pretend to be her real dad, and when Paloma falls for Carlota's lie, she starts to become very doubtful.

Romina in the meantime, has been cheating on Emiliano with her enemy Lilliana's boyfriend German Altamirano, and even becomes his lover. She begins to deceive Paloma after catching her kiss Emiliano one day on a street. When Romina becomes pregnant with German's child, she deceives everyone by saying that Emiliano is the father. Romina gets a DNA test taken to see who her unborn baby's father is, and allies with Carlota to alter the results, so she can marry Emiliano. It is successful, and Paloma is torn away from Emiliano because of this and believes she will never find love again. Emiliano in the meantime is forced to marry Romina, and on the day of the wedding Romina almost suffers a miscarriage, but is saved in time by doctors. The nuptials are done on the bed Romina is laying on, and Emiliano coincidentally agrees to be Romina's husband although he wishes he hadn't.

In the meantime, Paloma meets a man named Gabriel Lizarde, who saves her life after jumping off a church balcony. He introduces her to art, and soon becomes her paint teacher. Paloma also meets Gabriel's father Eugenio, who is a lawyer. Soon the two develop a sudden attraction for each other, much to Emiliano's jealousy as he tries constantly through the novela to win her heart again. Gabriel has a serious heart condition and might die anytime soon, but hides his illness from everyone, especially Paloma. Later on when Inaki's father Alonso receives a letter from Arcadia's niece, he reads it and it is from the late Arcadia who said she suspected Carlota of murdering Inaki.  An angeredd Alonso kidnaps Carlota and attempts to poison her to death with his own belladonna.  When he is almost successful, Carlota escapes from her hostage place.  Despite her dazed state, she hits Alonso in the head with a stick and then pushes him towards the path of an oncoming truck, which runs over Alonso killing him.

Carlota frames Cristobal and Natalia for the crime.  They are jailed in a prison in Pachuca and Cristobal is expelled from the priesthood.  During Cristobal's stay, his long-lost mother Madeline Marcell Gamboa visits and Cristobal is not too happy about seeing her since she abandoned him as a kid. After Cristobal and Natalia are proven to be innocent of murder, they are released from prison, where Cristobal returns to the priesthood eventually. Cristobal and Madeline have a tearful reconciliation after Cristobal learns the real reason why Madeline abandoned him as a kid, and the two develop a mother and son bond.

Emiliano's mother Diana had an affair with Orlando Ferrer in the past. Orlando is Emiliano's boss and although Rafael was believed to be Emiliano's real father, Orlando later reveals to Emiliano that he is his real father sending Emiliano into a state of disbelief. But soon, he accepts the truth. Romina's mother Camila dated Rafael Saenz for some time, but soon leaves him for Orlando Ferrer and marries him. However, after Camila discovers that Orlando cheated on her with his former girlfriend Angelica, she threatens for divorce, but Orlando says it will take a year for the divorce to be finalized.

Romina gives birth to a baby son, but soon Emiliano begins to doubt that Romina's child is his and he wants a divorce, but Romina will not have any of it. Emiliano eventually leaves Romina finding his own place to live, and soon tells a doctor he wants another DNA test. Paloma and Rufi (the house servant) eventually plan to leave Real del Monte with Dr. Bermudez. Carlota shoots him before they can leave and thus they are forced to stay at Real del Monte once more. In the meantime, Samuel (Romina's father) attempts to rob Camila, but is stopped by Rafael who saves her from him. Then Samuel is arrested and is sentenced to 15 years in prison.

Madeline soon meets Paloma, and becomes convinced that she looks almost like she did when she was young and asks Cristobal to find out if he is Paloma's real father. After finding out that the man Carlota had hired to pretend to be Paloma's father is not her real father, the two of them confront Carlota, and Cristobal finally confirms to her that the actor she hired is not Paloma's real father and that he is her real father. One day while in church, Cristobal and Paloma meet and he tells her he is her real father, and the two tearfully embrace. Paloma soon learns from Cristobal about how Carlota deceived him and Macarena when she was alive, and Paloma finally decides she has had enough of Carlota's domineering-self and her lies, and eventually leaves home with Cristobal and Rufi.

Paloma and Gabriel have fallen in love, but yet Paloma can't forget her feelings for Emiliano. They plan to get married soon. Carlota tells Eugenio she wants Paloma to come over to her house for a little "meeting", and Paloma reluctantly agrees to go to Carlota's house. There, things go out of control and Carlota tries to kill Paloma. While doing so, she confesses every crime she ever did. After finding out Carlota killed Inaki and especially Macarena, Paloma is shocked and scared and begins calling Carlota a murderer. She tries to save herself from Carlota, and at this time Cristobal, Rufi, Eugenio, and Gabriel break in through the back door. Carlota tries to push Paloma over the stairwell, but Paloma ducks and Carlota ends up going over the stairwell herself, and is knocked out unconscious. A shocked and saddened Paloma tells everyone about the killings Carlota confessed to and tells them she killed Inaki, Arcadia, Alonso, Macarena, and Dr. Bermudez, but Eugenio reveals that Dr. Bermudez is alive and in witness protection.

Carlota is taken to a hospital, where she pretends to be paralyzed. There are officers outside her hospital room ready to take her to prison the minute she gets out of the hospital. Romina in the meantime becomes depressed, leaves her baby with Camila, and leaves Real del Monte. While car racing with another guy, she ends up getting into a car accident and is almost killed, but luckily is saved in time by the Fire Department. After this traumatic experience, Romina decides to be a full-time mom, and eventually signs Emiliano's divorce papers and gives him his freedom.

A few days before the wedding between Paloma and Gabriel is to take place, Gabriel learns that due to his heart condition, he has only one month to live. On the wedding day and in front of the wedding guests, Gabriel tells Paloma he can't marry her due to his illness, and Emiliano steps in Gabriel's place as the groom. Gabriel approves of this, as he has known that Paloma has loved Emiliano for some time. Cristobal is the reverend at Paloma and Emiliano's wedding, and Paloma and Emiliano are finally married. In the aftermath of the wedding, Carlota arrives having escaped from the hospital, pulls out a gun and attempts to kill Paloma, but Gabriel gets in front of Paloma and is shot in the chest two times. He dies in the arms of Eugenio, Paloma, and Emiliano. Cristobal and the other priests chase Carlota to the roof of the church. When Carlota tries to shoot Paloma again, Cristobal stops her, and Carlota slips and falls from the church to the ground, seemingly dead.

Various days later, Cristobal becomes a bishop. Carlota survived the fall, but is in a wheelchair half-paralyzed and spends the rest of her life in a women's prison for all her crimes. Romina and German end up together as one happy family with their baby. Camila and Rafael are together happy as ever, and so is Orlando and Angelica. The novela ends with Emiliano and Paloma by the Real del Monte fountain, re-enacting the time they said they loved each other, before finally sharing a kiss.

Cast

Main
 Victoria Ruffo as  Macarena Espinoza de los Monteros Díaz
 Arturo Peniche as Juan Cristóbal Gamboa Martelli / Padre Juan Cristóbal Gamboa Martelli
Leticia Calderón as Carlota Espinoza de los Monteros Díaz
Laura Flores as Camila Ríos
César Évora as Eugenio Lizarde
Natalia Esperón as Luz Laguillo
Allisson Lozz  as Paloma Espinoza de los Monteros Díaz / Paloma Gamboa Espinoza de los Monteros
Altaír Jarabo as Romina Mondragón Ríos
Sebastián Zurita as Emiliano Saénz Noriega
Luis Hacha as Iñaki Iparraguirre
Zoraida Gómez as Liliana Vega
Alfredo Adame as Rafael Sáenz
Víctor Cámara as Orlando Ferrer
Magda Guzmán as Rufina "Rufi" Martínez
Carmen Montejo as Madeleine Martelli de Gamboa
Olivia Bucio as Diana Gudelia Noriega de Sáenz
Luis Gatica as Fiscal Cordero
Gerardo Murguía as Juan Carmona / Basilio Gaitán

Recurring
 Ferdinando Valencia as Germán Altamirano
 Pablo Magallanes as Aarón Eugenio Cortázar
 Queta Lavat as Madre Superiora
 Angelina Peláez as Arcadia Ortíz
 Lucero Lander as Inés Cortázar
 Eduardo Liñán as Padre Benito Farías
 David Ostrosky as Dr. Rodolfo Bermúdez
 Yolanda Ventura as Angélica Ciénega
 Paty Díaz as Natalia Ugarte de Iparraguirre
 Zoila Quiñonez as Doña Meche
 Ramon Abascal as Joel Martínez
 Jorge Alberto Bolaños as Samuel Mondragón
 Lola Forner as Carmen
 Manuel Navarro as Alonso Iparraguirre
 Haydeé Navarra as Miriam
 Claudia Godínez as Ana Mar
 Sergio Catalán as Darío Peñaloza
 Alfonso Iturralde as Juancho
  as Padre Mateo
 Erick Elías as Gabriel Lizarde

Special participation
 Luis Couturier as Rodrigo Espinoza de los Monteros
 Yanni Torres as Paloma Espinoza de los Monteros Díaz (child)
  as Romina Mondragón Ríos (child)
 Luciano Corigliano as Emiliano Saenz Noriega (Child)
 Rafael Valdés as Salvador "Chava"
 Bibi Gaytán as Sagrario Díaz de Espinoza de los Monteros
 Eduardo Capetillo as Javier Espinoza de los Monteros



References

External links

2008 telenovelas
2008 Mexican television series debuts
2009 Mexican television series endings
Mexican telenovelas
Spanish-language telenovelas
Televisa telenovelas